Maung Tay is a Burmese politician who currently serves as a Sagaing Region Hluttaw member of parliament for Hkamti Township No.1 Constituency. He is an Independent politician.

In the 2015 Myanmar general election and the 2020 Myanmar general election, he was elected as a Sagaing Region Hluttaw MP, and an elected representative from Hkamti Township No. 1 parliamentary constituency.

References

Living people
People from Sagaing Region
1986 births